was a junior college in Tenpaku-ku, Nagoya, Nagoya, Aichi Prefecture, Japan, and was part of the Tokai Gakuen group.

History 
 The predecessor of the school was founded in 1888.It was set up as Junior College in 1964.It was discontinued in 2005.

See also 
 Tokai Gakuen University

Universities and colleges in Nagoya
Educational institutions established in 1964
Japanese junior colleges
Private universities and colleges in Japan
Universities and colleges in Aichi Prefecture
1964 establishments in Japan